Shur Daraq-e Sofla (also Romanized as Shūr Daraq-e Soflá; also known as Shūr Daraq and Shūr Daraq-e Pā'īn) is a village in Angut-e Sharqi Rural District, Anguti District, Germi County, Ardabil Province, Iran. At the 2006 census, its population was 196, in 45 families.

References 

Tageo

Towns and villages in Germi County